Richard Nelson Williamson (born 8 March 1940) is a British independent Traditionalist Catholic bishop who opposes the changes in the church brought about by the Second Vatican Council. 

In 1988, Williamson was one of four Society of Saint Pius X (SSPX) priests illicitly consecrated as bishops by Archbishop Marcel Lefebvre, for which Pope John Paul II declared he had incurred ipso facto automatic excommunication. The validity of the excommunication has always been denied by the SSPX, who, citing canon law, argue that the consecrations were permissible due to a crisis in the Catholic Church. The excommunications, including that of Williamson, were lifted on 21 January 2009 but the suspension of the bishops from ministry within the Catholic Church remained in force. Certain exceptions were granted by Popes Benedict XVI and Francis as a way to foster dialogue and goodwill and to allow the priests to exercise limited ministry despite their canonically irregular situation.

Immediately afterward, Swedish television broadcast an interview recorded earlier at the SSPX's seminary in Zaitzkofen, Bavaria. During the interview, Williamson expressed his belief that no more than 200,000 to 300,000 Jews were killed during the Holocaust and that Nazi Germany did not use gas chambers. Based upon these statements, he was charged with and convicted of Holocaust denial by a German court. The Holy See declared that Pope Benedict had been unaware of Williamson's views when he lifted the excommunication of the four bishops. He said that Williamson would remain suspended from his episcopal functions until he unequivocally and publicly distanced himself from that stated position on the Holocaust. In 2010, Williamson was convicted of incitement in a German court in relation to those views; the conviction was later vacated on appeal. He was convicted again on this charge in a retrial in early 2013. Williamson appealed again, but his appeal was rejected.

After a number of incidents, including calling for the resignation of Bernard Fellay as the Superior General of the Society of St. Pius X, refusal to stop publishing his weekly email and an unauthorised visitation to Brazil, Williamson was expelled from the Society in 2012. Because of these consecrations, he was excommunicated latae sententiae from the Catholic Church again in 2015.

Williamson is fluent in English, French, German and Spanish.

Early life
Williamson was born in 1940 in Buckinghamshire, England, the middle son of a Marks & Spencer buyer and his wealthy American wife. Williamson attended Winchester College before going on to study at Clare College, Cambridge, where he received a  degree in English literature. Upon graduating, he taught at a college in Ghana for a brief period.

Williamson, originally an Anglican, was received into the Catholic Church in 1971. After a few months as a postulant at the Brompton Oratory, he left. He became a member of the Society of Saint Pius X, a traditionalist Catholic faction founded in 1970 by Archbishop Marcel Lefebvre in protest against what Lefebvre saw as the liberalism of the Second Vatican Council. Williamson entered the International Seminary of Saint Pius X at Écône, Switzerland, and in 1976 he was ordained a priest by Lefebvre.

Williamson subsequently moved to the United States, where he served as the rector of St. Thomas Aquinas Seminary in Ridgefield, Connecticut from 1983, and continued in the position when the seminary moved to Winona, Minnesota in 1988.

Consecration and excommunication 

In June 1988 Archbishop Marcel Lefebvre announced his intention to consecrate Williamson and three other priests (Bernard Fellay, Bernard Tissier de Mallerais, and Alfonso de Galarreta) as bishops. Lefebvre did not have a pontifical mandate for these consecrations (i.e. permission from the pope), normally required by canon 1382 of the 1983 Code of Canon Law. On 17 June 1988 Cardinal Bernardin Gantin, prefect of the Congregation for Bishops sent the four priests a formal canonical warning that they would automatically incur the penalty of excommunication if they were to be consecrated by Lefebvre without papal permission.

On 30 June 1988 Williamson and the three other priests were consecrated bishop by Archbishop Lefebvre and Antônio de Castro Mayer. On 1 July 1988 Cardinal Bernardin Gantin issued a declaration stating that Lefebvre, de Castro Mayer, Williamson, and the three other newly ordained bishops "have incurred ipso facto the excommunication latae sententiae reserved to the Apostolic See".

On 2 July 1988, Pope John Paul II issued the motu proprio Ecclesia Dei, in which he reaffirmed the excommunication, and described the consecration as an act of "disobedience to the Roman pontiff in a very grave matter and of supreme importance for the unity of the Church", and that "such disobedience – which implies in practice the rejection of the Roman primacy — constitutes a schismatic act".
Cardinal Darío Castrillón Hoyos, head of the commission responsible for implementing Ecclesia Dei, has said this resulted in a "situation of separation, even if it was not a formal schism."

The SSPX denied the validity of the excommunications, saying that the consecrations were necessary due to a moral and theological crisis in the Catholic Church, making them permissible under canon law.

His excommunication, along with that of Archbishop Lefebvre and the other bishops consecrated the Écône consecrations were lifted in 2009 by Benedict XVI.

Episcopal duties
After his episcopal consecration Williamson remained rector of St. Thomas Aquinas Seminary in Winona, Minnesota. He performed various episcopal functions, including confirmations and ordinations. In 1991, he assisted in the consecration of Licínio Rangel as bishop for the Priestly Society of St. John Mary Vianney after the death of its founder, Antônio de Castro Mayer. In 2006, he ordained two priests and seven deacons in Warsaw, Poland for the Ukrainian Greek Catholic Priestly Society of Saint Josaphat.

In 2003 Williamson was appointed rector of the Seminary of Our Lady Co-Redemptrix in La Reja, Argentina.

Views

Catholicism
In common with other traditionalists, Williamson opposes the changes in the Catholic Church brought about by the Second Vatican Council. He sees such changes as being unacceptably liberal and modernistic, and as being destructive to the Church. Among the changes he opposes are the Church's increased openness to other Christian denominations and other religions, and changes in the forms of Catholic worship such as the general replacement of the Tridentine Mass with the Mass of Paul VI. Williamson has criticised Pope John Paul II, to whom he attributed a "weak grasp of Catholicism". Williamson holds that the SSPX is not schismatic, but rather is composed of true Catholics who are keeping the "complete Roman Catholic apostolic faith".

Williamson is viewed as being located towards the hardline end of the traditionalist spectrum, though he does not go quite so far as to espouse sedevacantism. In the past, he opposed compromise between the SSPX and the Church leadership in Rome, accusing the latter of deceit and of being under "the power of Satan". He has been reported as viewing reconciliation between the SSPX and the Holy See as being impossible, and he has noted that some SSPX members might refuse to follow the Society in such a direction even if an agreement were reached.

Williamson was reportedly dismissive of Mother Teresa because of her supposedly 'liberal' views.

Society
Williamson holds strong views regarding gender roles. He opposes women wearing trousers or shorts, women attending college or university, and women having careers. He has urged greater "manliness" in men.

Regarding parenting style, he denounced the film The Sound of Music as "soul-rotting slush" and says that, by putting "friendliness and fun in the place of authority and rules, it invites disorder between parents and children."

Conspiracy theories

Williamson supports conspiracy theories regarding the assassination of John F. Kennedy, and the World Trade Center controlled demolition conspiracy theory, denying that the September 11 attacks were foreign terrorist attacks and claiming they were instead staged by the U.S. government. He has also said that the 7 July 2005 London bombings were an "inside job" and propagated rumours about the likelihood of a nuclear attack on the London Olympics in 2012.

Jews and Holocaust denial
Williamson condemns the Jewish religion. He has urged the conversion of the Jews to Catholicism.

He says that Jews and Freemasons have contributed to the "changes and corruption" in the Catholic Church. He has also stated that Jews aim at world dominion and believes The Protocols of the Elders of Zion to be authentic. Williamson has denied that he is promoting hatred, identifying the contemporary enemies of the faith as "Jews, Communists and Freemasons". He argues that "Anti-Semitism means many things today, for instance, when one criticizes the Israeli actions in the Gaza Strip. The Church has always understood the definition of anti-Semitism to be the rejection of Jews because of their Jewish roots. This is condemned by the Church."

Since the late 1980s, Williamson has been accused of Holocaust denial. Citing the pseudoscientific Leuchter report, Williamson has denied that millions of Jews were murdered in Nazi concentration camps and the existence of Nazi gas chambers and praised Holocaust denier Ernst Zündel. During an interview on Swedish television recorded in November 2008, he stated: "I believe that the historical evidence is strongly against, is hugely against six million Jews having been deliberately gassed in gas chambers as a deliberate policy of Adolf Hitler", and "I think that 200,000 to 300,000 Jews perished in Nazi concentration camps, but none of them in gas chambers."

On the occasion of Robert Faurisson's death in 2018, he summarised: "[T]he people who hold world-wide power today over politics and the media are people who want the godless New World Order," and "they have fabricated a hugely false version of World War Two history to go with a complete fabricated religion to replace Christianity."

Lifting of the excommunication
Wishing to heal the rift with the SSPX, Pope Benedict XVI lifted the declared automatic excommunications of the four bishops Marcel Lefebvre had consecrated, as they had requested. The decree was signed on 21 January 2009, the same day that the interview on Swedish television was broadcast. The decision stirred widespread outrage, particularly in Germany, where the interview was conducted and where Holocaust denial is illegal and punishable by imprisonment of up to five years. Reaction from the State of Israel and much of the worldwide Jewish community was strongly negative, and Abraham Foxman, president of the Anti-Defamation League, wrote to Cardinal Walter Kasper in order to express his opposition to any ecclesiastic re-integration of Williamson. In January 2009, the Chief Rabbinate of Israel suspended contacts with the Vatican. The Chief Rabbi of Haifa told The Jerusalem Post that he expected Williamson to retract publicly his statements before any dialogue could resume.

Pope Benedict XVI stated that he deplored all forms of antisemitism and that all Catholics must do the same. The Pope expressed his "unquestionable solidarity" with the Jewish people, and stated his hope that "the memory of the Shoah will induce humanity to reflect on the unpredictable power of hate when it conquers the heart of man", and condemned the denial of the Holocaust. Vatican officials stated that they had not been aware of Williamson's views prior to the lifting of the excommunication; as a result, in a July 2009 Vatican reorganisation, the Pope tightened control and supervision over reconciliation efforts with SSPX.

Williamson sent the Pope a letter expressing his regret about the problems that he had caused, but did not retract his statements. On 4 February 2009 the Vatican Secretariat of State issued a note stating that Williamson would have to distance himself unequivocally and publicly from the opinions that he had expressed before he would be permitted to act as a bishop within the Church. Williamson responded that he would do so only after looking at the historical evidence for himself.
On 26 February, he formally apologised for the offence that had been caused by his comments, but did not indicate that he had changed his views. The Vatican rejected his apology, stating that he needed to "unequivocally and publicly" withdraw his comments. Some Jewish groups have expressed disappointment at the ambiguity of his apology, because he failed to address the consensus about the Holocaust. He subsequently repeated the denial to followers, stating that "The fact is that the 6 million people who were supposedly gassed represent a huge lie."

Fellay of the SSPX initially denied responsibility, stating that Williamson's statements were his alone and that the affair did not concern the SSPX as a whole. However, he subsequently forbade Williamson from speaking out publicly about historical or political matters, and asked Pope Benedict for forgiveness for the damage done by Williamson's statements. In a subsequent interview he likened Williamson to uranium, asserting that "It's dangerous when you have it," but you can't "simply leave it by the side of the road."

The Vatican declared that "in order to be admitted to episcopal functions within the Church, (Williamson) will have to take his distance, in an absolutely unequivocal and public fashion, from his position on the Shoah, which the Holy Father (i.e., the Pope) was not aware of when the excommunication was lifted."

In Argentina

In Argentina, Williamson became a cult figure amongst the far-right seminarians, The Guardian reports.

Williamson was removed as the head of the seminary in La Reja, Argentina and Fellay stated that if Williamson again denied the Holocaust, he would be excluded from the society.

In February 2009, the government of Argentina asked Williamson to leave the country over irregularities with his visa, and stated that his recent statements about Jews "profoundly offend Argentinian society, the Jewish people and all of humanity". On 24 February 2009, Williamson flew from Argentina to London, where he was met by Michele Renouf, a former model known for her antisemitic views, with whom he had been put in touch by holocaust denier David Irving.

Criminal conviction in Germany
On 4 February 2009, German prosecutors announced the launch of a criminal investigation into the statements. In October 2009, a German court, using an "order of punishment" fined Williamson €12,000 after finding him guilty of Holocaust denial. Williamson denied the charges and appealed, paving the way for a full hearing that Williamson need not attend. He did not attend the trial, on orders from his society, on charges of inciting racial hatred in Regensburg, Germany on 16 April 2010, and was found guilty. The fine was appealed by lawyers from both sides; the lawyer Williamson hired was the former leader of the Wiking-Jugend, an outlawed Neo-Nazi group. The Society of St. Pius X ordered Williamson to find a new lawyer under threat of expulsion. His appeal was held on 11 July 2011. At appeal the lower court's decision was upheld but the fine was reduced to €6,500, reportedly due to Williamson's financial circumstances. On 22 February 2012 the higher court dismissed this conviction, finding that the initial charges against Williamson had been inadequately drawn, having failed to specify the nature of his offence, or at what point his filmed comments came under German jurisdiction, or in what sense he could be held liable for failing to prevent their publication in Germany. On 16 January 2013, he was prosecuted and condemned again, but this time with a much reduced fine of €1,600, because of his "unemployed state". He refused to pay the fine and appealed again, but his appeal was dismissed. On 31 January 2019 the European Court of Human Rights ruled against Williams' attempt to overturn a conviction for Holocaust denial on the grounds of free speech.

Expulsion from SSPX
In August 2012, Williamson administered the sacrament of confirmation to about 100 laypeople at the Benedictine Monastery of the Holy Cross in Nova Friburgo, Brazil, during an unauthorised visit to the State of Rio de Janeiro. The society's South American district superior, protested against his action on the SSPX website, saying that it was "a serious act against the virtue of obedience." In early October 2012, the leadership of the SSPX gave Williamson a deadline to declare his submission, instead of which he published an "open letter" asking for the resignation of the Superior General. On 4 October 2012, the Society expelled Williamson in a "painful decision" citing the failures "to show respect and obedience deserved by his legitimate superiors".

St. Marcel Initiative, episcopal consecrations, second excommunication 

In the first issue of his weekly blog after his expulsion, Williamson wrote: "Hang tight, everybody. We are in for one 'helluva' ride. Let's just make that a ride to Heaven!" And later he wrote: "For myself, I shall attempt to follow [God's] Providence in the ordaining of priests – or in the consecrating of bishops. God's will be done." He called for the establishment of a loose network of what he called "Catholic Resistance" to any proposal by the SSPX to drop its opposition to Rome. An initiative was set up by Williamson under the title "The St. Marcel Initiative".

On 19 March 2015, Williamson ordained Frenchman Jean-Michel Faure, a former member of the SSPX, as a bishop in a ceremony in Nova Friburgo, Brazil. Faure had, like Williamson, opposed reconciliation discussions between the SSPX and the Catholic Church. As this was done without papal mandate, both Faure and Williamson incurred a latae sententiae excommunication. The SSPX condemned the consecration as "not at all comparable to the consecrations of 1988" and as proof that Williamson and Faure "no longer recognize the Roman authorities, except in a purely rhetorical manner".

Exactly one year later, Williamson consecrated Tomás de Aquino Ferreira da Costa as a bishop in Brazil. This consecration also took place without papal approval. The following year, it was announced that Williamson intended to consecrate a third bishop, Mexican-American prelate Gerardo Zendejas, on 11 May 2017. The consecration was held at St. Athanasius Church in Vienna, Virginia.

In late December 2022, Williamson stated he had privately consecrated another bishop, Giacomo Ballini (the leader of the Cork branch of the group SSPX Resistance, a group founded by Williamson), in 2021. If this claim is to be believed, Williamson has in total consecrated four bishops since he has become independent.

Currently Williamson writes comments on St. Marcel Initiative, part of BRN ASSOCIATES INC, non-profit corporation registered in Virginia with a mailing address in St. Louis.

References

Bibliography
   (pbk). .
 
   (pbk). .
   (pbk). .
 .
  .
   (pbk). .

External links 
 Eleison Comments A weekly column in five languages by Bishop Richard Williamson.

1940 births
Living people
Alumni of Clare College, Cambridge
Late Modern Christian anti-Judaism
Antisemitism in England
Catholic priests convicted of crimes
Converts to Roman Catholicism from Anglicanism
Écône consecrations
English conspiracy theorists
British Holocaust deniers
English people of American descent
English people of Scottish descent
People convicted of Holocaust denial
English traditionalist Catholics
People educated at Winchester College
People excommunicated by the Catholic Church
People expelled from the Society of St. Pius X
Traditionalist Catholic conspiracy theorists
Traditionalist Catholic bishops
Traditionalist Catholic writers
9/11 conspiracy theorists
English expatriates in Argentina